The Foncalada  is a fountain of potable water located outside the city walls of Oviedo, Asturias, Spain; it was built by king Alfonso III of Asturias in the 9th century. This building remains the only surviving civil architectural item for public use of the Early Middle Ages. Its name was given after the inscription in  written on it. Built in Pre-Romanesque style, it has been included with other Asturian Pre-Romanesque sites on the UNESCO World Heritage Site List since 1998. 

It was originally placed near the city walls, next to an ancient Roman road. The decoration on top depicts the Victory Cross, symbol of Asturias.

Building 
This public fountain, which belongs to Oviedo Town Hall, is erected over a spring. It has a shape of a vaulted chapel and is crowned by the royal ensign of the Victory Cross. Below the Asturian Cross, two inscriptions remain:

References

External links 

 Estudio de la morfologia de las piedras de la Universidad de Oviedo
 Mirabilia Ovetensia:Ficha, reconstrucciones infograficas, y visita virtual al monumento.
 3D Reconstruction

Buildings and structures in Oviedo
World Heritage Sites in Spain
Bien de Interés Cultural landmarks in Asturias
Water supply and sanitation in Asturias